Hoita macrostachya is a species of legume known by the common names California hemp and large leather-root. It is native to California and Baja California where it can be found in moist areas of a number of habitat types. This is a hairy, glandular perennial herb producing a tall, branching stem approaching two meters in maximum height. The sparse, widely spaced leaves are each made up of three leaflets up to 10 centimeters long each attached to a long petiole. The leaflet blades are glandular. The plant produces many clublike raceme inflorescences on sturdy stalks from the stem. The inflorescence contains many purplish pealike flowers. The fruit is a hairy, veiny brown legume pod under a centimeter long containing a kidney-shaped seed.

External links
Jepson Manual Treatment
USDA Plants Profile
Photo gallery

Psoraleeae
Flora of Baja California
Flora of California
Flora without expected TNC conservation status